Punta Garin or Pic Garin or Pointe Garin (3,448 m) is a mountain of the Graian Alps, just south of Monte Emilius in Aosta Valley, Italy. It boasts a pyramidal summit.

References

Mountains of the Alps
Alpine three-thousanders
Mountains of Aosta Valley